The 1934 East Carolina Pirates football team was an American football team that represented East Carolina Teachers College (now known as East Carolina University) as an independent during the 1934 college football season. In their first season under head coach Doc Mathis, the team compiled a 1–4–1 record.

Schedule

References

East Carolina
East Carolina Pirates football seasons
East Carolina Pirates football